Lake Thisted is a natural lake in Kingsbury County, South Dakota, in the United States.

Lake Thisted takes its name from Thisted, Denmark, the native land of a first settler.

See also
List of lakes in South Dakota

References

Lakes of South Dakota
Lakes of Kingsbury County, South Dakota